Scott Francis McTominay (born 8 December 1996) is a professional footballer who plays as a midfielder for  club Manchester United and the Scotland national team.

McTominay is a graduate of the Manchester United youth academy and made his senior debut for the club in May 2017. Born in England, he qualified to play for Scotland through his Scottish father. He made his senior international debut in March 2018, and represented the side at UEFA Euro 2020.

Club career

Manchester United

Youth career
McTominay was associated with the Manchester United academy from the age of five after attending the club's development centre in Preston. Having played as a centre forward in the earlier years of his youth career, McTominay converted to a central midfield role under Warren Joyce. He signed his first professional contract in July 2013.

He made seven appearances for the Under-18s between 2013 and 2015, but struggled due to his small size. McTominay missed most of the 2014–15 season due to injuries relating to growth and development issues, growing 14 inches within two years.

McTominay struggled again during the 2015–16 season, making 11 appearances across the Under-19s and Under-21s, but commanded a place in the team the following season with three goals in 21 games prior to his senior call-up.

2016–17 season
On 30 April 2017, McTominay was named on the substitutes bench for a match against Swansea City in the Premier League. He made his first Premier League appearance on 7 May, coming on as a substitute against Arsenal, before starting Manchester United's final Premier League match of the season on 21 May, a 2–0 win at home to Crystal Palace.

2017–18 season

Ahead of the 2017–18 season, McTominay was named as a member of Manchester United's touring party for their pre-season tour of the United States, as well as for matches against Vålerenga and Sampdoria. In the match against Vålerenga on 30 July 2017, McTominay came on as a substitute for Paul Pogba just after the hour mark, and 10 minutes later, he scored his first senior goal for the club – the third in a 3–0 win. McTominay made his first appearance of the season against Burton Albion in the EFL Cup on 20 September 2017, replacing Marcus Rashford in the 64th minute, in a 4–1 victory. He made his European debut on 18 October, against Benfica, coming on for Henrikh Mkhitaryan in injury-time, winning a free-kick and getting Luisão sent off before seeing out the 1–0 away win. Two days later, McTominay signed a new contract with United, keeping him at the club until June 2021, with an option to extend for a further year. He made his first start of the season on 24 October, in a 2–0 win over Swansea at Liberty Stadium in the EFL Cup fourth round.

2018–19 season
On 21 January 2019, McTominay signed a contract extension, keeping him at United until 2023, with the option of another year. Replacing the injured Nemanja Matić, his first start of real significance under the management of Ole Gunnar Solskjær was against Liverpool on 24 February. McTominay was praised by pundits and reporters for his contributions in Champions League matches against Paris Saint-Germain and Barcelona. He scored his first competitive goal for United on 2 April 2019 in what was his 41st appearance for the club as they lost 2–1 to Wolverhampton Wanderers.

2019–20 season
McTominay scored his first goal at Old Trafford in a 1–1 draw against Arsenal on 30 September 2019. On 27 October, McTominay scored United's 2,000th Premier League goal in a 3–1 victory against Norwich City at Carrow Road. McTominay was credited with another goal, scored against Brighton on 10 November, after United successfully appealed to a Premier League panel that it should not be designated as an own goal by Davy Pröpper.

McTominay suffered a knee ligament injury on 26 December, which prevented him from playing for two months. He resumed full training on 19 February 2020. On 27 February, McTominay scored his first European goal in United's UEFA Europa League Round of 32 second leg match against Club Brugge, with United winning 5–0 (6–1 on aggregate). On 8 March, he scored United's second goal in a 2–0 win at home to Manchester City, shooting into an empty net from 40 yards after a mistake by goalkeeper Ederson, to help United to their first league double over their city rivals in a decade.

On 23 June 2020, McTominay signed a new contract with Manchester United set to keep him at the club until June 2025.

2020–21 season 
On 30 September 2020, McTominay scored his first goal of the season as United won 3–0 against Brighton & Hove Albion in the EFL Cup. On 20 December 2020, he scored his first league goals of the season, when he scored a brace inside 3 minutes in a 6–2 home win against Leeds United. This was the first time in the history of the Premier League that a player had scored twice in the opening three minutes of a game.

On 9 January 2021, McTominay became the stand-in captain in the FA Cup game against Watford and subsequently scored the only goal of the game inside five minutes as United won 1–0.

On 2 February 2021, McTominay scored a goal in Manchester United's Premier League record-equalling 9–0 home win against Southampton. Four days later, he followed this up by scoring in a 3–3 draw against Everton, making this his highest scoring season so far with six goals.

2021–22 season

On 30 December 2021, McTominay scored his first goal of the season when opened the scoring in a 3–1 win over Burnley.

On 10 January 2022, McTominay scored a goal against Aston Villa to help Manchester United advance into the fourth round of the 2021–22 FA Cup.

International career

Eligibility
McTominay was born in England but qualifies for Scotland through his father, who is from Helensburgh. McTominay attended training camps with the Scottish youth sides. In November 2017, McTominay told Scottish Football Association performance director Malky Mackay that he wanted to concentrate on securing a place in the Manchester United first team.

Speaking in February 2018, club manager José Mourinho suggested that new Scotland manager Alex McLeish should select McTominay "because it looks like England is missing him". McTominay pledged his future to Scotland and was selected in their squad for two friendlies in March. Later that month, McTominay's grandfather revealed Sir Alex Ferguson wanted him to represent Scotland. Manchester United academy coach Brian McClair explained "McLeish made a huge effort getting to Carrington to meet up with him, because it was in the middle of the bad weather that we had. He made it, put a case. Gareth Southgate sent him a text." McTominay said of the conversation with McLeish, "He travelled a hell of a long way to come and speak with me and I have to thank him for that. The conversation we had was relatively simple. I wanted to play for Scotland and I always have done since I was a young boy and it was an incredibly proud moment for me when he did call me up and hopefully I can kick on and do well."

Debut
On 23 March, McTominay was one of four players to be given their international debuts in McLeish's first game in charge. He played the first 57 minutes in a 1–0 friendly defeat to Costa Rica before being replaced by Stuart Armstrong. He made his first competitive appearance for Scotland in September 2018, as a 79th minute substitute for Callum McGregor in a 2–0 win against Albania. He was selected for international duty again in November 2019, but had to withdraw due to injury.

Euro 2020
For the international games played in September 2020, McTominay was used as a centre-back in a three-man defence. The Times commented that McTominay had the physique needed for the position, but had struggled to adapt to the role. He continued in this role during the October 2020 internationals, and the Daily Record said that there were indications that his play had improved. He converted both his penalties in the shootouts against Israel, and in the final playoff against Serbia, helping Scotland qualify for their first tournament in 23 years.

McTominay was named by Steve Clarke in the Scotland squad for the Euro 2020 finals. He started all three Group D games against the Czech Republic, England, and Croatia; however, Scotland failed to qualify for the knockout stages.

2022 World Cup qualification
He scored his first international goal on 9 October 2021, an injury-time winner against Israel in a 2022 World Cup qualifier.

Career statistics

Club

International

Scores and results list Scotland's goal tally first, score column indicates score after each McTominay goal.

Honours
Manchester United
EFL Cup: 2022–23
FA Cup runner-up: 2017–18
UEFA Europa League runner-up: 2020–21

Individual
UEFA Europa League Squad of the Season: 2020–21

See also
List of Scotland international footballers born outside Scotland

References

External links

Profile at ManUtd.com

1996 births
Living people
Sportspeople from Lancaster, Lancashire
Footballers from Lancashire
English footballers
Scottish footballers
Scotland international footballers
Association football midfielders
Manchester United F.C. players
Premier League players
UEFA Euro 2020 players
English people of Scottish descent